The Lololima is a river of the main island (Efate) of Vanuatu. It passes near Port Vila, the capital, on the southwest side of the island. There is a waterfall of the same name, near the settlement of Lololima, which is a significant tourist attraction.

References

Rivers of Vanuatu